Zwartsluis is a small city in the Dutch province of Overijssel.

History 

Zwartsluis's history started in the Eighty Years' War (1568–1648): it developed around the Swartersluys fortress, which controlled traffic on the Zwartewater inlet leading to Hasselt and Zwolle. Zwartsluis attracted some trade and a fishing fleet in later centuries. Zwartsluis also served as a consolidation point for the peat-fuel trade, but was surpassed in importance by its neighbours, especially downstream Genemuiden.

The Dutch Reformed Church of Zwartsluis is a historic Dutch Reformed church building located on the Kerkstraat and the organ in the church is a designated Rijksmonument.

Recreation 
The town is home to many recreational boats, as well as a heritage fleet of fishing and cargo vessels. The Arembergergracht canal links the town with the Beulaker and Belter lakes and a multitude of smaller bodies of water just north, created by peat digging.

Government 
Zwartsluis was a separate municipality until 2001, when it became a part of Zwartewaterland.

Notable people 
 Stieneke van der Graaf (born 1984), politician (MP)

References

External links

Municipalities of the Netherlands disestablished in 2001
Populated places in Overijssel
Former municipalities of Overijssel
Zwartewaterland